Linn High School is the only high school in Osage County R-II School District in Linn, Missouri. It is one of three high schools in Osage County, the other two being Chamois High School and Fatima High School.

About

Linn High School is majority white at 97%. The average ACT is 19.4, slightly lower than the Missouri average of 20.8. The student to teacher ratio is 13:1. 32% of the student body is economically disadvantaged. The high school is currently unranked in national and state rankings.

Activities
Cross Country
Baseball
Basketball
Track
Golf
Softball
Volleyball
Esports

References

Buildings and structures in Osage County, Missouri
Public high schools in Missouri
Education in Osage County, Missouri